Edward Miller Jr. (born June 20, 1969) is a former American football wide receiver in the National Football League (NFL) who played for the Indianapolis Colts. He played college football at University of South Carolina.

References 

1969 births
Living people
American football wide receivers
South Carolina Gamecocks football players
Indianapolis Colts players